The Porpoise class were submarines built for the United States Navy in the late 1930s, and incorporated a number of modern features that would make them the basis for subsequent , , , , , and  classes. In some references, the Porpoises are called the "P" class.

Design
The four submarines of the P-1 and P-3 types were authorized for construction in Fiscal Year 1934. The P-1 type was developed by Portsmouth. It was a full double hull design that was essentially an enlarged Cachalot. The P-3 type was developed by Electric Boat and was a partial double hull with single hull ends, a refinement of an earlier hull type used on the USS Dolphin (SS-169). Six submarines of the P-5 type were authorized for construction in Fiscal Year 1935. The Navy thought the Electric Boat design to be the better of the two, so all six boats were built to the partial double hull pioneered by Electric Boat. All ten submarines carried the same armament and propulsion machinery, and had the same operating characteristics and thus were considered to be the same class.

The five boats of this class built at the government owned Portsmouth Navy Yard and Mare Island Navy Yard were the last submarines in the USN to be built to a riveted construction method. While welding was used in non-critical areas, riveting was still used on the inner and outer hulls. Design conservatism and the economic realities of the Great Depression drove this decision by Portsmouth. The five boats built by Electric Boat were the first all welded submarines in the USN. All submarines built for the USN after this class by all yards were of all-welded construction.
 
Displacement was 1,934 tons submerged for the first four boats, 1,998 tons for the later ones.

The goal of a 21-knot fleet submarine that could keep up with the standard-type battleships was still elusive. This allowed extended patrols in Japanese home waters, and would remain standard through the Tench class of 1944.

Although it proved successful with improved equipment beginning with the Tambor class of 1940, the diesel-electric drive was troublesome at first. In this arrangement, the boat's four main diesel engines drove only electric generators, which supplied power to high-speed electric motors geared to the propeller shafts. The engines themselves were not connected to the propeller shafts. For submerged propulsion, massive storage batteries supplied electricity to the motors. Problems arose with flashover and arcing in the main electric motors. The Winton Model 16-201A 16-cylinder diesels also proved problematic, and were eventually replaced with 12-278As.

Five of the class received an additional pair of external bow torpedo tubes, probably early in World War II: Porpoise, Pike, Tarpon, Pickerel, and Permit. The original Mark 6 3 inch (76 mm)/50 caliber deck gun was eventually replaced during the war by the Mark 21 model. The new gun provided a nominal anti-aircraft capability because it allowed high elevations, although this capability was rarely used in combat. Plunger received a Mark 9 4 inch (102 mm)/50 caliber gun during an overhaul in 1943. The boats also originally carried two water jacketed M2 Browning .50 caliber machine guns, with one mounted on the "cigarette deck" on the aft end of the conning tower fairwater and one on a mount on the main deck forward. These guns were taken below when the boat submerged.

These boats were all built with a large bulky conning tower fairwater with an enclosed (but free-flooding) wheelhouse and a surface steering station at the forward end. Two periscopes were fitted, one that let into the control room and one that let into the conning tower. The original 30 foot periscopes proved to be too short and were later replaced with 34 foot models.

Boats in class
The Porpoise class consisted of the P-1 Type, P-3 Type, and P-5 Type subclasses:

Service
Following participation in exercises from 1937, all but three of the ten Porpoise class were forward deployed to the Philippines in late 1939. In October 1941 most of the front-line submarine force, including all sixteen Salmon and Sargo class boats, joined them. The Japanese occupation of southern Indo-China and the August 1941 American-British-Dutch retaliatory oil embargo had raised international tensions, and an increased military presence in the Philippines was felt necessary. The Japanese did not bomb the Philippines until 10 December 1941, so almost all of the submarines were able to get underway prior to the attack.

War experience showed that the boats were not optimized for combat. Armament needed to be upgraded and new technologies needed to be implemented. The conning tower fairwater in particular was deemed a liability as it was too large and easily sighted by the Japanese while surfaced. The Navy immediately authorized modification programs to address these issues. The conning tower fairwater was reduced in size in a fashion similar to the other fleet submarines, with both the forward and after sections cut away. This gave the fairwater a smaller, stepped appearance. Reducing the size of the fairwater also provided new platforms for mounting heavier machine guns, with two Oerlikon 20 mm cannons being mounted. An SD air search radar was mounted on an extendable mast on the forward edge of the conning tower fairwater, and an SJ surface search radar was added on a short mast on the bridge itself. As noted above the torpedo armament was upgraded on five of the boats, and improved engines were installed.

Two of the class were lost in Southeast Asian waters in early 1942, and another two were lost near Japan in 1943. By early 1945, all six surviving boats had been transferred to New London, Connecticut for training duties. Of these, four were used postwar as decommissioned reserve training submarines until they were scrapped in 1957.

See also

 Allied submarines in the Pacific War
 Unrestricted submarine warfare
 Torpedo
 List of submarine classes of the United States Navy
 List of lost United States submarines
 List of submarines of the Second World War

Notes

References
 
 Campbell, John Naval Weapons of World War Two (Naval Institute Press, 1985), 
 
 Gardiner, Robert and Chesneau, Roger, Conway's All the World's Fighting Ships 1922-1946, London: Conway Maritime Press, 1980. .
 Johnston, David "No More Heads or Tails: The Adoption of Welding in U.S. Navy Submarines", The Submarine Review, June 2020, pp. 46-64.
 Johnston, David A Visual Guide to the U.S. Fleet Submarines Part Four: Porpoise Class 1934-1945
 Lenton, H. T. American Submarines (Navies of the Second World War) (Doubleday, 1973), 
 Silverstone, Paul H., U.S. Warships of World War II (Ian Allan, 1965),

External links

 On Eternal Patrol, website dedicated to all US submarines and submariners lost to all causes
 All Submarines
 Navsource.org fleet submarines page
 Pigboats.com pre-1941 submarine photo site
 DiGiulian, Tony Navweaps.com later 3"/50 caliber gun

Submarine classes
 
 Porpoise